Events from the year 2010 in Romania.

Incumbents

President: Traian Băsescu
Prime Minister: Emil Boc

Events 
 February 19 - Romania is set to introduce a tax on fast food in March.
 May 19 - At least 40,000 Romanians rally in Bucharest to protest planned wage cuts the government says are needed to shore up the ailing economy.
 June 25 - The Constitutional Court of Romania rules that government budget plans are "unconstitutional"; this decision cannot be appealed.
 June 29 - At least 21 people die and hundreds are evacuated after major floods in the northeast of Romania.
 August 31 - Fossils of Balaur genus dinosaur are unearthed in Romania. 
 September 2 - Sebastian Vlădescu is replaced as Romanian Minister of Finance by Gheorghe Ialomitianu as part of a Cabinet reshuffle.

Deaths

January 

 January 5 - Toni Tecuceanu, 37, Romanian comedy actor, bacterial infection.

February 

 February 25 – Gheorghe Gaston Marin, 91, Romanian politician.

March 

 March 9 - Gheorghe Constantin, 77, Romanian footballer and manager.
 March 17 - Ștefan Gheorghiu, 83, Romanian violinist.

April 

 April 4 - Lajos Bálint, 80, Hungarian-born Romanian Roman Catholic prelate, archbishop of Alba Iulia (1990–1993).
 April 17 - Alexandru Neagu, 61, Romanian footballer (FC Rapid București).
 April 29 - Avigdor Arikha, 81, Romanian-born Israeli painter, complications of cancer.

May 

 May 26 - Jean Constantin, 82, Romanian actor, natural causes.

July 

 July 6 - Simion Stanciu, 60, Romanian pan flautist, after long illness.
 July 14 - Mădălina Manole, 43, Romanian pop singer, suicide.
 July 29 - Nicolae Popescu, 72, Romanian mathematician.

August 

 August 21 - Gheorghe Apostol, 97, Romanian politician, General Secretary of the Romanian Communist Party (1954–1955).
 August 22 - Gheorghe Fiat, 81, Romanian Olympic bronze medal-winning (1952) boxer.

November 

 November 1 - Mihai Chițac, 81, Romanian general, Minister of Interior (1989–1990), after long illness.
 November 5 - Adrian Păunescu, 67, Romanian author, poet and politician.
 November 16 - Ilie Savu, 90, Romanian footballer and coach, hepatic cirrhosis.
 November 20 - Roxana Briban, 39, Romanian soprano, apparent suicide.

December 

 December 10 - Nicolas Astrinidis, 89, Romanian-born Greek composer, pianist, conductor, and educator.

See also
 
2010 in the European Union
2010 in Europe
Romania in the Eurovision Song Contest 2010
Romania at the 2010 Winter Olympics
Romania at the 2010 Winter Paralympics
Romania at the 2010 Summer Youth Olympics
List of 2010 box office number-one films in Romania

References

External links

 
Years of the 21st century in Romania
Romania
2010s in Romania
Romania